The Melody Masters were a series of first-rate big band musical film shorts produced by Warner Brothers, under the supervision of Samuel Sax at their Vitaphone studio in New York between 1931 and 1939, and in Burbank, California with producer Gordon Hollingshead in charge between 1940 and 1946.

Overview

Among the most popular short subjects of their kind (making the Motion Picture Herald top money-making shorts lists in 1939 ); these were an offshoot of the Vitaphone Varieties. Each ran from 9 to 11 minutes in length and was produced in black and white.

While rival studios like Universal Pictures focused mostly on the performance itself in their own “Name Band Musicals” shorts, Warner Bros. added more storyline material and visual experimentation. Early films often used a gimmick to frame the musical performances such as the roller skates used in Eddie Duchin & His Orchestra. As the series progressed, the uses of multiple exposures (a great example being Symphony of Swing with Artie Shaw), optical effects, mirrors (i.e. Glen Gray and the Casa Loma Orchestra) and stark shadow lighting (i.e. Henry Busse and His Orchestra) made this series stand out against the competition.

Jean Negulesco was a key director on some of the best titles of the early 1940s before graduating to features. Life (magazine) photographer Gjon Mili contributed to the most frequently seen today title, Jammin' the Blues, entered into the National Film Registry in 1995.

After the series’ official end in 1946, there were two follow-up series called “Memories from Melody Lane” and “Hit Parade of the Gay Nineties” that differed somewhat in style and narration, tracing the history of popular music since the 1890s.

Current availability

A group of them were released on laser disc (through MGM/UA) and Warner DVD, starting in the 1990s. In the latter format, they were mostly “extras” with various Warner features before the Warner Archive Collection produced a set titled Warner Bros. Big Band, Jazz & Swing Shorts in 2010.

List of titles

Below is a full listing by title, director and major credits, followed by release date, review date (Film Daily) or copyright date. DVD availability is also provided.

1931

1932

1933

1934

1935

1936

1937

1938

1939

1940

1941

1942

1943

1944

1945

1946-1947

Memories from Melody Lane (filmed 1947)

Directed by Jack Scholl, narrated by Art Gilmore and featuring the Merry Makers as musical support.

Let's Sing a Song from the Movies / July 17, 1947 (available on Romance on the High Seas Greatest Classic Legends Doris Day DVD)
Let's Sing a Song of the West / September 27, 1947
Let's Sing an Old Time Song / December 26, 1947
Let's Sing a Song about the Moonlight / January 24, 1948 (available on On Moonlight Bay (film) DVD)
Let's Sing a Stephen Foster Song / May 8, 1948
Let's Sing Grandfather's Favorites / August 8, 1948

Hit Parade of the Gay Nineties (filmed 1950)

Directed by Jack Scholl

When Grandpa Was a Boy / October 7, 1950
The Old Family Album / December 16, 1950
In Old New York / May 15, 1951
Musical Memories / June 30, 1951

See also
Vitaphone Varieties
List of short subjects by Hollywood studio#Warner Brothers

Links
Melody Masters listed on the IMDb.com
Film Daily links
NPR DVD review of Warner Bros. Big Band, Jazz & Swing Shorts

References
 
 
 Motion Pictures 1912-1939 Catalog of Copyright Entries 1951 Library of Congress 
 Motion Pictures 1940-1949 Catalog of Copyright Entries 1953 Library of Congress 
 Motion Pictures 1950-1959 Catalog of Copyright Entries 1960 Library of Congress 
BoxOffice back issue scans available (release date information in multiple issue “Shorts Charts”)

Notes

Vitaphone short films
Warner Bros. short films